Homogyna ignivittata is a moth of the family Sesiidae. It is found in Mpumalanga, South Africa.

References

Endemic moths of South Africa
Sesiidae
Moths of Africa
Moths described in 1919